This is the 2019–2020 winter transfer window for Brazilian football season 2019–20. Additionally, players without a club may join at any time, clubs may sign players on loan at any time, and clubs may sign a goalkeeper on an emergency loan if they have no registered goalkeeper available. It includes football transfers related to clubs from the Campeonato Brasileiro Série A and  Campeonato Brasileiro Série B.

Note that the summer transfer window in Brazil occurs during the new year, and the winter transfer window occurs during the mid-year. The summer transfer window is open from January 1 to March 31.

Campeonato Brasileiro Série A

Athletico Paranaense

In:

Out:

Atlético Goianiense

In:

Out:

Atlético Mineiro

In:

Out:

Bahia

In:

Out:

Botafogo

In:

Out:

Ceará

In:

Out:

Corinthians

In:

Out:

Coritiba

In:

 

Out:

Flamengo

In:

Out:

Fluminense

In:

Out:

Fortaleza

In:

Out:

Goiás

In:

Out:

Grêmio

In:

Out:

Internacional

In:

Out:

Palmeiras

In:

Out:

Red Bull Bragantino

In:

Out:

Santos

In:

Out:

São Paulo

In:

Out:

Sport Recife

In:

Out:

Vasco da Gama

In:

Out:

Campeonato Brasileiro Série B

América Mineiro

In:

Out:

Avaí

In:

Out:

Botafogo-SP

In:

Out:

Brasil de Pelotas

In:

Out:

Chapecoense

In:

Out:

Confiança

In:

Out:

CRB

In:

Out:

Cruzeiro

In:

Out:

CSA

In:

Out:

Cuiabá

In:

Out:

Figueirense

In:

Out:

Guarani

In:

Out:

Juventude

In:

Out:

Náutico

In:

Out:

Oeste

In:

Out:

Operário Ferroviário

In:

Out:

Paraná

In:

Out:

Ponte Preta

In:

Out:

Sampaio Corrêa

In:

Out:

Vitória

In:

Out:

References 

2019-20
Brazil
Transfers